This is a list of notable buildings, complexes and monuments in London.

0-9
 2 Willow Road
 2 Marsham Street
 6 Burlington Gardens
 6 Ellerdale Road
 10 Downing Street
 10 Palace Gate
 10 Upper Bank Street
 11 Downing Street
 12 Downing Street
 25 Bank Street
 30 St Mary Axe (The Gherkin)
 40 Bank Street
 48 Doughty Street
 50 Queen Anne's Gate
 55 Broadway
 71 Fenchurch St
 221B Baker Street
 89 Albert Embankment

A

 Abbey Mills Pumping Stations
 Abney Park Cemetery
 Abney Park Chapel
 Addington Palace
 Adelphi Buildings
 Adelphi Theatre
 Admiralty
 Admiralty Arch
 The Albany
 Albemarle Club
 Albert Bridge
 Albert Embankment
 Albert Memorial
 Aldwych Theatre
 Alexandra Palace
 All England Lawn Tennis and Croquet Club (Wimbledon)
 All Hallows-by-the-Tower
 All Hallows-on-the-Wall
 All Hallows Staining
 All Saints, Camden Town
 All Saints, Margaret Street
 All Saints' Church, Edmonton
 All Saints Church, Fulham
 All Saints Church, Kingston upon Thames
 All Saints Church, Peckham
 All Souls Church, Langham Place
 Almeida Theatre
 Ambassadors Theatre
 Apollo Theatre
 Apollo Victoria Theatre
 Apsley House
 Aquatics Centre (London)
 Archway (London)
 Army and Navy Club
 Arnos Grove tube station
 Arsenal Stadium
 The Arts Club
 Arundel House
 Ashburnham House
 Ashby's Mill
 Athenaeum Club
 Australia House
 Aviva Tower

B

 Baden-Powell House
 Baitul Futuh Mosque
 Baker Street tube station
 Balfron Tower
 Bank of England
 Bankside Power Station (Tate Modern)
 Banqueting House at Whitehall
 Barbados High Commission in London
 Barbican Centre
 Barbican Estate
 Barking Abbey
 Barking Park
 Barnes Railway Bridge
 Barnet Gate Mill
 Battersea Bridge
 Battersea Park
 Battersea Power Station
 Battersea Railway Bridge
 Bedford Park
 Bedford Square
 Belgrave Square
 Belmarsh (HM Prison)
 Benjamin Franklin House
 Bentley Priory Museum
 The Berkeley
 Berkeley Square
 Bethlem Royal Hospital
 Bevis Marks Synagogue
 Big Ben
 Billingsgate Fish Market
 Birkbeck, University of London
 Bishopsgate Institute
 Blackfriars Bridge
 Blackfriars Railway Bridge
 Blackfriars station
 Blackwall Tunnel
 Boodle's
 Bloomsbury Square
 Borough Market
 Boston Manor House
 Bow Quarter
 Bow Street Magistrates' Court
 Brent Cross
 Brick Lane Mosque
 BBC Television Centre
 British Dental Association
 British Medical Association
 British Museum
 British Optical Association
 British Library
 Brixton (HM Prison)
 Broadcasting House
 Broadgate
 Brockwell Park
 Bromley Hall
 Brompton Cemetery
 Brookmans Park Transmitter
 Brooks's
 Broomfield Park, Palmers Green
 Bruce Castle
 Brunel Engine House
 Brunel University
 Brunswick Centre
 Buckingham Palace
 Burlington Arcade
 Burlington House
 Business Design Centre
 BT Tower (Post Office Tower/Telecom Tower)
 Bunhill Fields
 Bush House
 Bushy Park
 Butler's Wharf
 Buxton Memorial Fountain

C

 Cabinet Office
 Cadogan Hall
 Cambridge Circus
 Cambridge House
 Camden Arts Centre
 Camden Market
 Canada House
 Canal Museum
 Canary Wharf
 Cannon Street Railway Bridge
 Cannon Street station
 Canons Park
 Carling Academy Brixton
 Carlton Club
 Carlton House
 Carlton House Terrace
 Carlyle's House
 Cavalry Barracks, Hounslow
 Cenotaph
 Central Synagogue, Great Portland Street
 Centre Point
 Channel Four Television Corporation
 Charing Cross
 Charing Cross Hospital
 Charing Cross railway station
 Charles Dickens Museum
 Charlton House
 Charterhouse Square
 Chatham House
 Chelsea Barracks
 Chelsea Bridge
 Chelsea Embankment
 Chelsea Harbour
 Chelsea Old Church (All Saints)
 Chelsea Physic Garden
 Chessington Hall
 Chester Terrace
 Chiswick Bridge
 Chiswick House
 Chiswick Park tube station
 Christ Church Greyfriars
 Christ Church Spitalfields
 Churchill Museum and Cabinet War Rooms
 Church House
 Church of the Immaculate Heart of Mary (Brompton Oratory)
 Citigroup Centre
 City Hall
 City of London Cemetery and Crematorium
 CityPoint
 City University
 Clapham Junction railway station
 Clarence House
 Claridge's
 Cleopatra's Needle
 The Clink
 Cochrane Theatre
 Coin Street Community Builders
 Coliseum Theatre
 College of Arms
 Colney Hatch Lunatic Asylum
 Comedy Theatre
 Commonwealth Institute
 The Connaught Hotel
 Conservative Campaign Headquarters
 County Hall
 Covent Garden
 Craven Cottage
 Crimean War Memorial
 Criterion Restaurant
 Criterion Theatre
 Crosby Hall
 Crossness Pumping Station
 Crown and Treaty
 Croydon Clocktower
 Croydon Minster
 Croydon Palace
 Croydon Town Hall
 The Crystal Palace
 The Crystal Palace Dinosaurs
 Crystal Palace National Sports Centre
 Crystal Palace transmitting station
 Cumberland Terrace
 Cuming Museum
 Custom House, City of London
 Cutty Sark

D

 Dana Centre
 Danson House
 Dartford Crossing
 De Morgan Centre
 The Den
 Dennis Severs' House
 Department for Environment, Food and Rural Affairs
 Department of Health
 Department for Work and Pensions
 Deptford Town Hall
 Design Museum
 Devonshire House
 Diana Fountain, Bushy Park
 Diana, Princess of Wales Memorial Fountain
 Dr. Johnson's House
 Dolphin Square
 Dominion Theatre
 Dorchester Hotel
 Dover House
 Down House
 Duke of York's Barracks
 Duke of York Column
 Dulwich College
 Dulwich Picture Gallery
 Dutch Church, Austin Friars

E

 Eagle House
 Ealing Abbey
 Ealing Town Hall
 Earls Court Exhibition Centre
 Eastbury Manor House
 East Croydon station
 East Finchley tube station
 East India Docks
 East London Mosque
 Eaton Square
 Elfin Oak
 Eltham Palace
 Embassy of the United States in London
 Emirates Stadium
 Empress State Building
 Equestrian statue of Charles I, Charing Cross
 Euston railway station
 Euston Tower
 Evelina Children's Hospital
 ExCeL Exhibition Centre

F

 Feltham (HM Prison)
 Fenchurch Street railway station
 Fenton House
 Finsbury Estate
 Firepower - The Royal Artillery Museum
 Fitzroy Square
 Florin Court
 Foreign and Commonwealth Office
 Fortnum & Mason
 Forty Hall
 Foundling Museum
 Fournier Street
 Foyles
 Free Church, Hampstead Garden Suburb
 Freemason's Hall
 Freud Museum
 Fulham Palace
 Fulham Railway Bridge

G

 Gaiety Theatre
 Garrick Club
 Garrick Theatre
 Geffrye Museum
 The George Inn, Southwark
 Gibson Gardens
 Gielgud Theatre
 Globe Theatre
 Golden Lane Estate
 Golders Green Crematorium
 Goldsmiths College
 Gordon Square
 Gray's Inn
 Greenland Passage
 Great Ormond Street Hospital
 Green Park
 Greenwich foot tunnel
 Greenwich Hospital
 Greenwich Millennium Village
 Greenwich Power Station
 Greenwich Theatre
 Gresham Club
 Grosvenor Bridge
 Grosvenor Chapel
 Grosvenor House Hotel
 Grosvenor Square
 Grove Park (Sutton)
 Grovelands Park
 Griffin Park
 Grim's Dyke
 The Guards Chapel
 Guildhall
 Guildhall School of Music and Drama
 Gunnersbury Park
 Gurdwara Sri Guru Singh Sabha
 Guy's Hospital
 Gwydyr House
 The Gherkin

H

 Hackney Empire
 Hackney Town Hall
 Hall Place
 Ham House
 Hamleys
 Hammersmith Apollo
 Hammersmith Bridge
 Hammersmith Flyover
 Hammersmith Town Hall
 Hampton Court Bridge
 Hampton Court Palace
 Handel House Museum
 Hanover Square
 Hanwell Asylum
 Hare Hall
 Harrods
 Harrow School
 Haymarket Theatre
 Hay's Galleria
 The Hayward
 Heathrow Airport
 Hendon Police College
 Her Majesty's Theatre
 HM Treasury
 HMS Belfast
 HMS President
 Heythrop College
 Highgate Cemetery
 Highpoint I
 Hippodrome
 Hither Green Cemetery
 Hogarth's House
 Holborn Viaduct
 Holland House
 Holloway (HM Prison)
 Holwood House
 Holy Trinity Church Marylebone
 Holy Trinity College Bromley
 Holy Trinity, Sloane Street
 Home Office
 Hoover Building
 Hop Exchange
 Horniman Museum
 Hornsey Town Hall
 Horse Guards
 Horse Guards Parade
 HSBC Tower, London
 Hungerford Bridge
 Hurlingham Club
 Hyde Park
 Hyde Park Barracks

I

 Ickenham Hall
 Imperial College
 Imperial War Museum
 India House (London)
 Inner London Crown Court
 Inner Temple
 Institute of Cancer Research
 Institute of Chartered Accountants in England & Wales
 Institute of Contemporary Arts
 Institute of Education
 InterContinental London Park Lane Hotel
 Isis (HM Prison)
 Isokon building

J

 Jewel Tower
 Jewish Museum (Camden)
 John Smith House (Southwark)
 Jubilee Gardens, South Bank

K

 Keats' House
 Kennington Park
 Kensal Green Cemetery
 Kensington Palace
 Kensington Palace Gardens
 Kensington Roof Gardens
 Keston Windmill
 Kew Bridge
 Kew Bridge Steam Museum
 Kew Palace
 Kew Railway Bridge
 Kenwood House
 Kimpton Fitzroy London Hotel (Hotel Russell)
 King's College
 King's Cross railway station
 King's Observatory
 King's Reach Tower
 Kingston Bridge
 Kingston Railway Bridge
 Kingston University
 Kingston upon Thames Guildhall
 Kingsway tramway subway
 Kneller Hall

L

 Laban Dance Centre
 Lambeth Bridge
 Lambeth Palace
 Lambeth Town Hall
 Lancaster House
 The Landmark London
 The Lanesborough
 Langham Hotel
 Langtons
 Lansbury Estate
 Lansdowne House
 Latchmere House
 Lauderdale House
 Law Society of England and Wales
 Leadenhall Market
 Leicester Square
 Leighton House Museum
 Lewisham Shopping Centre
 Limehouse Basin
 Limehouse Town Hall
 Liberty's
 Liberty Shopping Centre
 Lincoln's Inn
 Lincoln's Inn Fields
 Linley Sambourne House
 Liverpool Street station
 Lloyd's of London
 Loftus Road
 Londonderry House
 The London Ark
 London Biggin Hill Airport
 London Bridge
 London Bridge rail station
 London Business School
 London Central Mosque
 London Charterhouse
 London City Airport
 London Docks
 London Eye
 London Fire Brigade Museum
 London Hilton on Park Lane Hotel
 London IMAX
 London Metropolitan University
 London Palladium
 London Planetarium
 London School of Economics
 London School of Hygiene & Tropical Medicine
 London South Bank University
 London Stock Exchange
 The London Studios
 London Velopark
 London Victoria station
 London Wall
 London Zoo
 Lord's Cricket Ground
 Lots Road Power Station
 Lowther Lodge
 Lyceum Theatre
 Lyric Theatre

M

 Madame Tussaud's
 The Mall
 Malta High Commission in London
 Manchester Square
 Mansion House
 Marble Arch
 Marble Hill House
 Marlborough House
 Marx Memorial Library
 Marylebone station
 Mayesbrook Park
 Marylebone Town Hall
 Metro Central Heights
 Metropolitan Tabernacle
 MI6
 Michelin House
 Middle Temple
 Middlesex Guildhall
 Middlesex University
 Millbank Tower
 Millennium Bridge
 Millennium Dome
 Ministry of Agriculture, Fisheries and Food
 Ministry of Defence
 Monument to the Great Fire of London
 Monument to the Women of World War II
 Moorfields Eye Hospital
 Morden College
 Mount Pleasant sorting office
 Museum of Garden History
 Museum of London
 Mycenae House

N

 The National Archives
 National Army Museum
 National Film Theatre
 National Firefighters Memorial
 National Gallery
 National Liberal Club
 National Maritime Museum
 National Physical Laboratory
 National Police Memorial
 National Portrait Gallery
 Natural History Museum
 Naval & Military Club
 Neasden Temple
 Nelson's Column
 New Covent Garden Market
 New Spitalfields Market
 New West End Synagogue
 New Zealand House
 Noël Coward Theatre
 Nordic churches in London
 Norman Shaw Building
 Northumberland House
 Northwick Park Hospital
 North Woolwich Old Station Museum
 Notre Dame de France
 No 1 Poultry
 Nunhead Cemetery

O

 Odeon Leicester Square
 The Old Bailey
 Old Deer Park
 Old Spitalfields market
 Old Vic
 Olde Cheshire Cheese
 Olympia, London
 Olympic Stadium (London)
 One Canada Square (Canary Wharf Tower)
 One Churchill Place
 Oriental Club
 Orleans House
 Osterley Park
 Oxford and Cambridge Club
 Oxford Circus
 The Oval
 OXO Tower

P

 Paddington Basin
 Paddington Green Police Station
 Paddington Station
 Great Pagoda, Kew Gardens
 Palace Theatre
 Palace of Westminster
 Palm House
 Parsloes Park
 Paternoster Square
 Peace Pagoda
 Peckham Library
 Pembroke Lodge, Richmond Park
 Pentonville (HM Prison)
 Peter Jones (department store)
 Petrie Museum of Egyptian Archaeology
 Phoenix Cinema
 Phoenix Garden
 Phoenix Theatre
 Piccadilly Circus
 Pitzhanger Manor
 Playhouse Theatre
 Plumstead Common Windmill
 Polish War Memorial
 Portcullis House
 Portland House
 Postman's Park
 Public Record Office
 Purcell Room
 Putney Bridge
 Putney Vale Cemetery

Q

 Queen Elizabeth II Conference Centre
 Queen Elizabeth Hall
 Queen Elizabeth II Bridge
 Queen Mary, University of London
 Queen's Beasts
 Queen's Chapel
 Queen's House, Greenwich
 Queen's Tower

R

 Ranger's House
 Red House, several places
 Reform Club
 Regent's Canal
 Regent's College
 Regent's Park
 Regent's Park Barracks
 Regent Street
 Richmond Bridge
 Richmond Lock and Footbridge
 Richmond Palace
 Richmond Park
 Richmond Railway Bridge
 Richmond Theatre
 Ritz Hotel
 Robin Hood Gardens
 Rotherhithe Tunnel
 The Roundhouse
 Royal Academy of Dramatic Art
 Royal Academy of Music
 Royal Air Force Club
 Royal Air Force Museum Hendon
 Royal Albert Hall
 Royal Arsenal
 Royal Artillery Barracks
 Royal Artillery Memorial
 Royal Automobile Club
 Royal Botanic Gardens, Kew
 Royal Brompton Hospital
 Royal College of Art
 Royal College of Music
 Royal College of Physicians
 Royal College of Surgeons of England
 Royal Courts of Justice
 Royal Court Theatre
 Royal Docks
 Royal Exchange
 Royal Festival Hall
 Royal Free Hospital
 Royal Holloway, University of London
 Royal Hospital Chelsea
 Royal Institute of British Architects
 Royal Institution
 Royal London Hospital
 Royal Mews
 Royal Military School of Music
 Royal National Theatre
 Royal Opera House
 Royal Observatory, Greenwich
 Royal Over-Seas League
 Royal Pharmaceutical Society
 Royal School of Mines
 Royal Society
 Royal Thames Yacht Club
 Royal Veterinary College
 Rules (restaurant)
 Ruskin House
 Russell Square

S

 Saatchi Gallery
 Sadler's Wells Theatre
 St Alfege's Church, Greenwich
 St Andrew-by-the-Wardrobe
 St Andrew, Holborn
 St Andrew Undershaft
 St Andrew's Church, Hornchurch
 St Andrew's Enfield
 St Anne and St Agnes
 St Anne's Church, Kew
 St Anne's Limehouse
 St Augustine Watling Street
 St Augustine's, Queen's Gate
 St Bartholomew's Hospital
 St Bartholomew-the-Great
 St Bartholomew-the-Less
 St Benet Paul's Wharf
 St Botolph's, Aldersgate
 St Botolph without Aldgate
 St Botolph-without-Bishopsgate
 St Bride's Church
 St. Clement Danes
 St Clement Eastcheap
 St Columba's Church
 St Cuthbert's, Earls Court
 St Dunstan-in-the-East
 St Dunstan's, Stepney
 St Dunstan-in-the-West
 St Edmund, King and Martyr
 St Edward the Confessor, Romford
 St Ethelburga's Bishopsgate
 St Etheldreda's Church
 St George's Cathedral Southwark
 St. George's Church, Bloomsbury
 St George's, Hanover Square
 St George's Hospital
 St George in the East
 St George the Martyr, Holborn
 St George the Martyr Southwark
 St Giles in the Fields
 St Giles-without-Cripplegate
 St Helen's Bishopsgate
 St. James's Palace
 St James's Church, Piccadilly
 St James Church, Clerkenwell
 St James's Club
 St James Garlickhythe
 St James's Hotel and Club
 St. James's Park
 St. James's Square
 St James the Less, Pimlico
 St John-at-Hackney
 St John-at-Hampstead
 St John's Church, Waterloo
 St John's Gate, Clerkenwell
 St. John's, Smith Square
 St John's Wood Church
 St John the Baptist Church, Chipping Barnet
 St John the Baptist, Pinner
 St John the Divine, Kennington
 St Joseph's Church, Highgate
 St Jude's Church, Hampstead Garden Suburb
 St Katherine Cree
 St Katharine Docks
 St Lawrence Jewry
 St Leonard's, Shoreditch
 St Luke's Church, Chelsea
 St Magnus-the-Martyr
 St Margaret Lothbury
 St Margaret Pattens
 St Margaret's, Westminster
 St Mark's Church, Bromley
 St Mark's Church, Kennington
 St Martin-in-the-Fields
 St Martin, Ludgate
 St Martin's Theatre
 St Mary Abbots
 St Mary Abchurch
 St Mary Aldermary
 St Mary-at-Finchley Church
 St Mary-at-Hill
 St Mary Magdalen Bermondsey
 St Mary Magdalene Gardens
 St Mary Magdalene Church, Holloway Road
 St Mary Magdalene, Paddington
 St Mary Magdalene, Richmond
 St Mary Magdalene Woolwich
 St Mary Moorfields
 St Mary-le-Bow
 St Mary-le-Strand
 St Mary the Virgin, Mortlake
 St Mary Woolnoth
 St Mary's Church, Barnes
 St Mary's Church, Battersea
 St Mary's Church, Hampstead
 St Mary's Church, Hampton
 St Mary's Church, Hendon
 St Mary's Church, Paddington
 St Mary's Church, Putney
 St Mary's Church, Rotherhithe
 St. Mary's Church, Walthamstow
 St Mary's Church, Wimbledon
 St Mary's, Harrow on the Hill
 St Mary's Hospital
 St Mary's, Islington
 St Mary's, Twickenham
 St Mary's University College, Twickenham
 St Marylebone Parish Church
 St Matthias Church, Richmond
 St Matthias Old Church
 St Michael, Cornhill
 St Michael and All Angels, Bedford Park
 St Michael Paternoster Royal
 St Michael's Church, Camden Town
 St Nicholas Church, Chiswick
 St Nicholas Church, Sutton, London
 St Nicholas Cole Abbey
 St Olave Hart Street
 St Pancras New Church
 St Pancras Old Church
 St Pancras railway station
 St Patrick's Church, Soho Square
 St Paul's Cathedral
 St Paul's Church, Knightsbridge
 St. Paul's Church, Shadwell
 St Paul's, Covent Garden
 St. Paul's, Deptford
 St Paul's, Hammersmith
 St Peter ad Vincula
 St Peter and St Paul, Bromley
 St Peter upon Cornhill
 St Peter's Church, Hammersmith
 St Peter's Church, Petersham
 St Peter's Church, Walworth
 St Raphael's Church, Surbiton
 St Saviour, Pimlico
 St Sepulchre-without-Newgate
 St Sophia's Cathedral
 St Stephen Walbrook
 St Thomas Church
 St Thomas's Hospital
 St Vedast Foster Lane
 Savoy Chapel
 Savoy Hotel
 Savoy Theatre
 Science Museum
 Schomberg House
 School of Oriental and African Studies
 The School of Pharmacy, University of London
 Scotland Yard
 Seaford House
 Selfridges
 Senate House (University of London)
 Serpentine Gallery
 Shadwell Basin
 Shell Mex House
 Shell Tower
 Shirley Windmill
 Sir John Soane's Museum
 Sloane Square
 Smithfield Market
 Somerset House
 South Africa House
 Southgate tube station
 Southside House
 Southside Wandsworth
 Southwark Bridge
 Southwark Cathedral
 Spencer House
 Stamford Bridge (stadium)
 Statue of Eros (Piccadilly Circus)
 Strand Palace Hotel
 Stratford Circus
 Stratford railway station
 Sudbury Hill tube station
 Sudbury Town tube station
 Surbiton railway station
 Surrey Commercial Docks
 Surrey Quays Shopping Centre
 Sutton House
 Swakeleys House
 Swiss Cottage Central Library
 Syon House

T

 Tate Britain
 Tate Modern
 Tavistock Square
 Teddington Lock
 Telehouse Docklands
 Temperate House
 Temple Bar
 Temple Church
 Thames Barrier
 Thames Embankment
 Thames House
 Thameside (HM Prison)
 Thames Tunnel
 Thames Valley University
 Thatched House Lodge
 Theatre503
 Theatre Museum
 Theatre Royal, Drury Lane
 Theatre Royal Stratford East
 The Shard
 Thistle Tower Hotel
 Thorpe Coombe Hospital
 Three Mills
 Tower 42 (Natwest Tower)
 Tower Bridge
 Tower Hamlets Cemetery
 Tower of London
 Tower Hill Memorial
 The Tower House
 Trades Union Congress
 Trafalgar Square
 Transport Museum
 Travellers Club
 Trellick Tower
 Trinity Buoy Wharf
 Trinity Church, Sutton
 Trinity House
 Trinity Independent Chapel
 Trocadero
 Twickenham Bridge
 Twickenham Film Studios
 Twickenham Stadium
 Twinings

U

 Unicorn Theatre
 Unilever House
 Union Chapel
 Union Jack Club
 United University Club
 University College Hospital
 University College, London
 University of East London
 University of Greenwich
 University of North London
 University of the Arts London
 University of Westminster
 University Women's Club
 Upminster Windmill
 Uxbridge tube station

V

 Valence House Museum
 Valentines Park
 Vanbrugh Castle
 Vauxhall Bridge
 Vestry House Museum
 Victoria and Albert Museum
 V&A Museum of Childhood
 Victoria Coach Station
 Victoria Embankment
 Victoria Memorial
 Victoria Palace Theatre
 Victoria Park, East London
 Victoria Park, Finchley

W

 The Waldorf Hilton, London
 Wales Office (Gwydyr House)
 Wallace Collection
 Waltham Forest Town Hall
 Wandsworth Bridge
 Wandsworth Common Windmill
 Wandsworth (HM Prison)
 Wanstead House
 War Office
 Warehouse Theatre
 Wat Buddhapadipa
 Waterloo Bridge
 Waterloo station
 Waterside
 Wellcome Trust
 Wellington Arch
 Wellington Barracks
 Wembley Arena
 Wembley Stadium
 Westfield
 West India Docks
 West London Synagogue
 Westminster Abbey
 Westminster Bridge
 Westminster Cathedral
 Westminster Central Hall
 Westminster School
 West Norwood Cemetery
 Whitechapel Gallery
 Whitechapel Idea Store
 Whitefield's Tabernacle, Tottenham Court Road
 White Hart Lane
 Whiteleys
 White Lodge, Richmond Park
 White's
 Whitgift Centre
 Wigmore Hall
 William Morris Gallery
 Willis Building
 Wimbledon Windmill
 Winchester Palace
 Winfield House
 Woburn Square
 The Women's Library
 Woodlands House
 Woolwich foot tunnel
 Woolwich Town Hall
 Wormwood Scrubs (HM Prison)
 Worshipful Company of Drapers
 Worshipful Company of Fishmongers
 Worshipful Company of Glaziers and Painters of Glass
 Worshipful Company of Goldsmiths

X

Y

 Yalding House
 York House, Strand
 York House, Twickenham
 Young's Brewery

Z

Zimbabwe House

See also
List of buildings and structures
List of London venues
List of London Underground stations
List of London railway stations
Tall buildings in London. The
:Category:Buildings and structures in London

 
Structures
Structures